12 cm/45 3rd Year Type naval gun was a Japanese naval gun and coast defense gun used on destroyers, and torpedo boats of the Imperial Japanese Navy during World War II.

Design and development
The 12 cm/45 gun designed in 1895 was an indigenous variant of an Elswick Ordnance Company export design known as the Pattern Y. The Japanese designation was the "Type 41". Later in 1921 the 12 cm/45 gun was used as the basis for a high-angle anti-aircraft gun, designated the 12 cm/45 10th Year Type. The "Third Year Type" refers to the Welin breech block used and this should not be confused with the later Type 3 12 cm AA Gun developed by the Imperial Japanese Army in 1943. In the Japanese Army artillery naming system, "Type 3" refers to the year of introduction, rather than the type of breech block used.

A re-design in 1922 called the 12 cm 11th Year Type naval gun (Model 1922) with a shorter gun barrel and a horizontal sliding breech-block was used on submarines and torpedo boats.

In addition to its shipboard role it was widely deployed as a coastal defense gun for Japanese bases in the Pacific and was one of the more common types found by Allied forces.

Naval Use

 Chidori-class torpedo boat
 Etorofu-class escort ship
 Hashidate-class gunboat
 Kamikaze-class destroyer
 Kawakaze-class destroyer
 Minekaze-class destroyer
 Momi-class destroyer
 Mutsuki-class destroyer
 Shimushu-class escort ship
 Tsukushi-class survey ship
 Wakatake-class destroyer

See also

Weapons of comparable role, performance and era
 BL 4.7 inch /45 naval gun: British equivalent
 5"/51 caliber gun: US Navy equivalent

Gallery

References

Bibliography
 Bishop, Chris (eds) The Encyclopedia of Weapons of World War II. Barnes & Nobel. 1998. 
 
 Chant, Chris. Artillery of World War II, Zenith Press, 2001,

External links

Naval guns of Japan
120 mm artillery